Scott Piper (born June 18, 1954) is a former American football wide receiver. He played for the Atlanta Falcons in 1976. Signed with the Denver Broncos in 1979, suffered career ending knee injury.

In 2015 he was cast as “officer Gregg Knox” in “The 2nd Greatest”, followed by “Coach Simms” in the 2017 film “ A High School Story”.

References

1954 births
Living people
American football wide receivers
Arizona Wildcats football players
Atlanta Falcons players